Translation & Interpreting. The International Journal of Translation and Interpreting Research is a peer-reviewed academic journal covering all aspects of translation and language interpretation.

Overview
The online journal is hosted by the University of Western Sydney School of Humanities and Communication Arts. It was established in 2009.

References

External links

Certified Translation Services
Importance Of Tourism Translation

Translation journals
Publications established in 2009
2009 establishments in Australia
English-language journals
Biannual journals
Language interpretation
Western Sydney University
Academic journals published by universities and colleges